Edward David Berman  (born 8 March 1941 in Lewiston, Maine) is an American-born British community educator, social activist, children's poet, playwright, director and producer. Later Berman saved the World War I ship, HMS President (1918) which became the charity's centre for fifteen years.

He became founding chair (2014) of Rhodes Scholars in Britain and a trustee. In 2015 he was invited by MIT's Bits and Atoms to establish Fab Foundation UK. A Harvard graduate and Rhodes Scholar in 1962, Berman is Inter-Action's founder (1968) and CEO. Currently, in addition to the activities above, Berman runs international workshops and training courses in the Inter-Action Creative Game Method and Inter-Action Instant Business Enterprise System.

Early life and education 

Berman was born in Lewiston, Maine, on 8 March 1941 to Jack and Ida (née Webber) Berman. He attended Lewiston High School but despite becoming a regional and national debating champion, did not graduate. Instead he accepted the offer of a place at Harvard University at the age of 15, to study Government & Middle Eastern Languages and Literature. He was a resident at Winthrop House and graduated in the Class of 1961.

He then won a Rhodes Scholarship to study at Exeter College, Oxford University in 1962.[1] Berman was unable to finish his doctorate at Oxford in 1965, due to an unprovoked attack whilst researching in Istanbul, Turkey, which left him with a cranial blood clot, a badly damaged back and given a year to live. Unable to continue his research, Berman moved to London.

Inter-Action and community action/development 
Berman established Inter-Action in London in 1968 to explore new forms of creative and participatory programmes for the Inner City, and find new ways to motivate learning. The work is targeted at disadvantaged families and young people (especially young girls and young women in science and technology), children with learning disabilities and people returning to education or seeking training. It has been described as "the most exciting community education agency in Europe".

Essentially, Inter-Action is involved in problem-solving work of a community development nature. It takes specific challenges and tries to develop practical projects and techniques which can be widely disseminated and used by others throughout the UK and Europe. The work with disadvantaged groups of young people (and adults) and especially girls/young women has been a major theme throughout the decades of the work of Inter-Action and now Fab Foundation UK.

Inter-Action Trust (later Inter-Action Social Enterprise Trust) has been the umbrella for Berman's activities, including a series of theatres, at least six theatre companies, community festivals and seasons of plays, making print and radio media accessible to local communities, establishing the first City Farm, the National Federation of City Farms and Community Gardens (see below), the first community architecture service in Europe and numerous other projects. Inter-Action commissioned the first community arts resource centre in Europe which was purpose-built on a derelict Council site in Talacre Road, West Kentish Town, London, designed by Cedric Price. Inter-Action has influenced the work of numerous other community arts initiatives as well as direct offshoots in Milton Keynes and Leeds.

The Father & Mother Xmas Union (FXU) was set up in 1969 to stage large-scale social and activist events such as protests against the National Front and Selfridges (for using red-leg labour).

City Farms: In 1971, Berman negotiated with British Rail to take over numerous tracts (10,000 acres) of land throughout the UK which were unusable for development under modern planning legislation because of their proximity to the railway lines. He established the first City Farm in Britain in Kentish Town, north London, in 1971 (which became a model for City Farms across the country) and then the National Federation of City Farms and Community Gardens which currently includes approx. 1,200 City Farms and Community Gardens throughout the UK.

Fun Art Bus: In 1972, to bring theatre and arts into the community,  Inter-Action converted a Routemaster bus to create a small theatre on its upper deck, along with a cinema showing short films and slide shows downstairs. The bus was brought back during the 2012 Olympic Games in which Berman was a torchbearer.

HMS President: In 1988 the ship was saved by the charity Inter-Action Social Enterprise Trust, run by Berman, who invented the term “social enterprise” in the UK in 1970, to describe organisations such as the National Federation of City Farms and Community Gardens, which has more than 1,200 sites. In President social enterprises included: a base for start-up companies for young people; audio-visual studios; a publishing company; an NGO Advisory Service, and an 'event deck' to earn funding for the charity. This period saved her from scrap, and preserved her for future generations. She had become a London landmark, marked on street maps, so was permitted to retain her warship title and name "HMS President" with the added suffix "(1918)" to distinguish her from the new shore establishment of the same name. Her sister ship, Chrysanthemum was hired to Steven Spielberg for the boat chase sequences shot in 1988 in Tilbury Docks for the film Indiana Jones and the Last Crusade. She was then laid up in the River Medway, where the brackish water rusted her hull so badly that she was scrapped in 1995.

Numerous other activities including the establishment of WAC – the Weekend Arts College (now simply Wac Arts), the first Community Media Van, a community print shop including the publishing arm, Inter-Action In-Print, a film company, Infilms, a new centre on HMS President (1918), a free school and a plethora of media and computer projects from the 1980s onward; then two more theatre companies: the Old Age Theatre Society (OATS) working in old people's homes and the British American Repertory Company (BARC), the first joint company approved by both Equity Unions and both countries for non-star actors and stage staff.

Additionally, he has been Chairman of the successful Save Piccadilly Campaign in the 1970s (to stop the high-rise office development surrounding the Circus) and the action against JP Morgan to open their blocking of a walkway/cycling path of the Thames Walkway on the Isle of Dogs. He continues to spend part of each year in India, advising on social enterprise projects, mainly with women, and environmental projects, especially water developments.

He has worked in Hong Kong, Germany, the Netherlands, Norway, Sweden, Russia, South Africa and India as a director/trainer as well as advising on developing new social enterprises. In Russia he worked as an adviser to three state ministers and in the UK as a non-party-political Special Advisor on inner city matters to Cabinet ministers, Michael Heseltine and Tom King.  All of these he did whilst remaining in the Inter-Action Co-operative.

Theatre career 

During the 1960s, Berman became a prominent figure in British Alternative Theatre. In 1967, he became the playwright-in-residence at the Mercury Theatre in Notting Hill.

The  Ambiance Lunch-hour Theatre Club and the Almost-Free Theatre
In 1971 Berman set up the Almost Free Theatre on Rupert Street, Soho in the West End. The audiences paid what they could afford (at least one penny) to see a range of productions based on a range of social and political themes. The Almost Free also staged numerous individual new plays by Mike Stott, Henry Livings, Michael Stevens, Wolf Mankowitz, Edward Bond and many others. Sir Tom Stoppard developed several of his key one act plays for Berman's theatres including After Magritte, Dogg's Hamlet, Cahoot's Macbeth and the highly successful Dirty Linen and New-Found-Land.

Dirty Linen and New-found-land
A pair of two 1976 Tom Stoppard plays that are always performed together, produced and directed by Berman. New-Found-Land interrupts the two parts of Dirty Linen. It is a comedy about the British citizenship process, based on the real-life naturalization of Berman. It was first performed as an Ambiance Lunch-Hour Theatre Club presentation at Interaction's Almost Free Theatre in 1976. Then, opening in June 1976, it played for more than four years at the Arts.

Black Theatre Season
Berman programmed Britain's first season of plays on black issues: Black and White Power Plays at the Ambiance in 1970. The season introduced the work of African-American playwrights like Ed Bullins and LeRoi Jones, alongside work from white playwrights on Black issues such as Israel Horovitz.

Gay Theatre Season
The 1975 season of gay plays was the first to be staged in Britain. The season led to the formation of gay theatre companies, principally Gay Sweatshop, Britain's first gay and lesbian theatre company, founded by Gerald Chapman.

Dogg's Troupe
Dogg's Troupe staged street theatre and community events in hospitals, old people's homes and other community venues. Berman played the roles of Professor R.L. Dogg and Otto Premiere Check.

TOC (The Other Company)
The Other Company was set up by Berman and the innovative Israeli director Naftali Yavin in 1968.

Plays and publications 

Below is a selection of plays, publications and albums written or recorded by Berman. Some publications are published under R. L Dogg, Berman's title character from Dogg's Troupe community theatre group.

Bibliography

Berman, E., & Wintle, J. (1973), The Fun Art Bus: An Inter-Action Project by ED Berman. London: Eyre Methuen. 
Berman, E. (1975) Homosexual Acts: A Volume of Gay Plays. London: Hill and Garwood Printing. 
Biren, A. (1975), Basic Video in Community Work. London: Inter-Action In-Print. 
Berman, E. (1979), 10 of the Best: British Short Plays. London: Inter-Action In-Print and Billing and Sons. 
Berman, E., & J. Zeitlyn (1980), Print: How you can do it yourself, 3rd Edition. London: Inter-Action In-Print. 
Berman, E & Elizabeth Leyh (1980), Concrete Sculpture, 1st Edition. London: Inter-Action In-Print. 
Humphries, S (1984), The Handbook of Oral History: Recording Life Stories. London: Inter-Action In-Print. 
Berman, E., & L. Dewhurst (1984), Selecting Business Software: A Guide to Success with Microcomputing”. London: Frances Printer. 
Berman, E. & Huw Richard (1985), Make a Real Job Of It. Inter-Action in Print. London: Inter-Action In-Print. 
Berman, E. (1986) Breaks for Young Bands. Introduction by Sting. London: Omnibus Press & Inter-Action In-Print. 
Berman, E. (1987), How to Set up a Small Business. London: University Press, Cambridge. 
Dowmunt, T. (1987), Video with Young People. London: Inter-Action In-Print & Cassell Publishers. 
Berman, E. (1989), Healthy Learning Songs: Activities and Projects. London: BBC Books. 
Berman, E., & Gorney C. (1989), New Game-Songs. London: Inter-Action and BBC Books. 
Berman, E. (2001), Game Songs with Prof Dogg's Troupe. London: Inter-Action In-Print and A&C Black. 
 
Converting a Bus
Battered Women and the Law
Bringing Books to People
Charitable Status
Basic Video and Community work
Print: How You Can Do It Yourself

As Professor R.L. Dogg
Dogg, R. L., & E. Leyh (1974), Zoo’s Who: Poetry and Colouring Book Volume 1. London: Inter-Action In-Print.
Dogg, R.L., & E. Leyh (1974), Zoo’s Who: Poetry and Colouring Book Volume 2''. London: Inter-Action In-Print.

References

External links 
 www.inter-action.uk.com
 Unfinished Histories Interview
 vimeo.com/interactiongb

Living people
1941 births
Harvard College alumni
American chief executives
American Rhodes Scholars
Alumni of Exeter College, Oxford
American emigrants to England
Naturalised citizens of the United Kingdom
Lewiston High School (Maine) alumni